Jimmy Pike (c1940-2002) was a  Walmatjarri Aboriginal artist.

Life
Born east of Japingka, an important jila or permanent waterhole in the Great Sandy Desert, he grew up as a hunter-gatherer. Like many of his people he drifted north toward the river valleys and the sheep and cattle stations where food was more plentiful. Living as a fringe-dweller around  Cherrabun Station he eventually joined relatives at the station camp and worked as a stockman. He was named Jimmy Pike, after Phar Lap's jockey, by a cattle station manager.

Pike learned to use western art materials while in Fremantle Prison. Even before he was released from prison his work was exhibited in major Australian galleries.

In 1989 Pike featured in a documentary The Quest of Jimmy Pike.

He illustrated a book Jimmy and Pat meet the Queen with his wife Pat Lowe. Pike has collaborated on a number of other books with his wife.

He held exhibitions in United Kingdom, Philippines, China, Namibia and Italy.
During an exhibition of his paintings in London in 1998, Pike and his wife Pat Lowe attended a garden party at Buckingham Palace.

He held a joint exhibition with Zhou Xiaoping in the National Gallery of China, Beijing, called "Through the Eyes of Two Cultures". He was the first Australian painter to show there.

Pike died from a heart attack in 2002.

Individual exhibitions 
1985 Aboriginal Artists Gallery, Melbourne.
1986 Aboriginal Artists Gallery, Sydney.
1986 Black Swan Gallery, Fremantle.
1987 Ben Grady Gallery, Canberra.
1987 Tynte Gallery, Adelaide.
1987 Craft Centre Gallery, Sydney.
1987 Seibu Shibuya, Tokyo.
1988 Birukmarri Gallery, Fremantle.
1988 Capricorn Gallery, Port Douglas.
1988 Tynte Gallery, Adelaide.
1988 Blaxland Gallery, Sydney and Melbourne.
1991 Rebecca Hossack Gallery, London
2000 Museo d'arte contemporanea AM International Bivongi, provincia di Reggio Calabria, Italy.
2000 Museo dell'Aeronautica G. Caproni, Trento, Italy.

Group exhibitions 
1984 Her Majesty's Theatre, Perth.
1985 Contemporary Aboriginal Art, Praxis, Fremantle.
1987 Print Council Gallery, Melbourne.
1987 Recent Aboriginal Art of WA, National Gallery of Australia, Canberra.
1987 The Fourth National Aboriginal Art Award Exhibition, Museum and Art Gallery of the NT, Darwin.
1987 Galerie Exler, Frankfurt.
1987 Art and Aboriginality, Aspex Gallery, Portsmouth, UK.
1988 Addendum Gallery, Fremantle.
1998 Australian Aboriginal Graphics from the Collection of the Flinders University Art Museum.
1989, Prints by Seven Australian Aboriginal Artists, International Touring Exhibition through the Print Council and Department of Foreign Affairs & Trade.
1998 Aboriginal Art. The Continuing Tradition, National Gallery of Australia, Canberra.
1990 i'ete Australien a' Montpellier, Musee Fabre Gallery, Montpeliler, France.
1990 Balance 1990, Views, Visions, Influences, Queensland Art Gallery, Brisbane.
1990 Contemporary Aboriginal Art from the Robert Holmes a Court Collection, Harvard University, University of Minnesota, Lake Oswego Centre for the Arts, USA.
1990 Tagari Lia. My Family, Contemporary Aboriginal Art from Australia, Third Eye Centre, Glasgow, UK.
1991 Flash Pictures, National Gallery of Australia.
1991 The Eighth National Aboriginal Art Award Exhibition, Museum and Art Gallery of the Northern Territory, Darwin.V 1992 Working in the Round, Flinders University Art Museum, Adelaide.
1992 Crossroads - Towards a New Reality, Aboriginal Art from Australia, National Museums of Art, Kyoto and Tokyo.
1992 The Ninth National Aboriginal Art Award Exhibition, Museum and Art Gallery of the Northern Territory, Darwin.
1992 Kimberley Creations, Broome. WA.
1992/3 New Tracks Old Land: An Exhibition of Contemporary Prints from Aboriginal Australia, Touring USA and Australia.
1993 The Tenth National Aboriginal Art Award Exhibition, Museum and Art Gallery of the Northern Territory, Darwin.
1993 Galerie im Vinyard Berlin.
1994 New Tracks Old Land Touring USA.
1994 Contemporary Visions Melbourne.
1994 Artmove Claremont.
1995 Art Gallery of WA, Major Retrospective.
1996 NATSI Art Award NTMG Darwin.
1996 Friendship Gallery Hefei, People's Republic of China.
1997 Durack Gallery Broome.
1997 Fireworks Gallery Brisbane.
1997 Framed Gallery Darwin.
1998 Rebecca Hossack Gallery London.
1999 "Through the eyes of two cultures", National Gallery of China, Beijing.
1999 NATSI Art Award NTMG Darwin
2000 Japingka Gallery Perth.

Collections 
 Australian Museum, Sydney
 Art Gallery of New South Wales, Sydney
 Art Gallery of South Australia, Adelaide
Art Gallery of Western Australia, Perth
Flinders University Art Museum, Adelaide
Gold Coast City Art Gallery, Surfers Paradise
Museum and Art Gallery of the Northern Territory, Darwin
Museum Victoria, Melbourne
National Gallery of Australia, Canberra
National Gallery of Victoria, Melbourne
National Maritime Museum, Darling Harbour, Sydney
Parliament House Art Collection, Canberra
Queensland Art Gallery, Brisbane
Queensland University of Technology Collection
Queensland Museum
The Holmes a Court Collection, Perth
BHP Collection
Christensen fund Collection
Oodgeroo Collection

References

External links 
 Jimmy Pike desert designs Craft Australia.
 The Jimmy Pike Experience World printmakers.
 Jimmy Pike Trust.

1940s births
2002 deaths
Australian Aboriginal artists
Indigenous Australians from Western Australia
People from the Kimberley (Western Australia)
20th-century Australian painters
20th-century Australian male artists
Australian male painters